Charles Colbert Snyder (September 14, 1922 – February 5, 2007) was an American football coach. He served as the head football coach at Marshall University from 1959 to 1967, compiling a record of 28–58–3. A native of Catlettsburg, Kentucky, Snyder played college football in the late 1940s as a tackle under Cam Henderson. From 1948 to 1956 he was the head football coach at his alma mater, Catlettsburg High School, leading his teams to a record of 55–21–4 in nine seasons. Snyder also worked as an assistant football coach at the University of Kentucky and the University of Toledo. He died at the age of 84, on February 5, 2007, in Bellevue, Ohio.

Head coaching record

College

References

External links
 

1922 births
2007 deaths
American football tackles
Kentucky Wildcats football coaches
Marshall Thundering Herd football coaches
Marshall Thundering Herd football players
Toledo Rockets football coaches
High school football coaches in Kentucky
People from Catlettsburg, Kentucky
People from Kenova, West Virginia
Players of American football from Kentucky